Dungey is an English-language surname of Cornish origin. Notable people with the surname include:

 Azie Mira Dungey, American actress
 Doris Dungey (1961–2008), American blogger
 Lori Dungey (born 1957), actress
Mardi Dungey (1966–2019), Australian macroeconomist
 Merrin Dungey (born 1971), film and television actress
 Ryan Dungey (born 1989), motocross racer

See also 
 Mount Dungey

References 

English-language surnames